The State Register of Heritage Places is maintained by the Heritage Council of Western Australia. , 233 places are heritage-listed in the Shire of Quairading, of which seven are on the State Register of Heritage Places.

List
The Western Australian State Register of Heritage Places, lists the following seven state registered places within the Shire of Quairading:

References

Quairading
Quairading
Shire of Quairading